Julianne Marie Sitch (born September 18, 1983) is an American former professional soccer defender. She is currently a coach for the Chicago Red Stars and head coach of the University of Chicago men's soccer team. In 2022, she became the first woman in NCAA history to lead a men’s team to a national championship.

Early life
Born and raised in Oswego, Illinois, Sitch attended Oswego High School and played for the Region II Olympic Development Program.

DePaul University
Sitch attended DePaul University where she set career records in goals, assists, and points. In 2005, she ended her DePaul career as the program's all-time leading scorer with 32 goals and 26 assists.

Club career

Melbourne Victory
In 2009, Sitch signed with the Melbourne Victory FC in Australia's W-League. She was voted team MVP.

Sky Blue FC
In 2009, Sitch played for Sky Blue FC during the inaugural season of the Women's Professional Soccer (WPS). She started 11 of 16 regular season games and scored one goal on June 28 during a match against the Saint Louis Athletica.

Chicago Red Stars (WPS)
Sitch signed with her hometown team, the Chicago Red Stars, for the 2010 WPS season. Of her signing, she was quoted, "I am very happy to be coming home to Chicago to continue my playing career. I've always dreamt about playing in my hometown, where all of my family and friends—who have supported me throughout my career—can come and watch. I love Chicago. I love Toyota Park and the energy it brings to the game. I couldn't be more happy." Sitch made 13 appearances for the Red Stars logging a total of 358 minutes.

Atlanta Beat
After the Chicago Red Stars ceased operations in the WPS and Sitch was briefly picked up by the Western New York Flash, Sitch signed with the Atlanta Beat of the WPS for the 2011 season. She made two appearances for the club, totaling 118 minutes.

Chicago Red Stars (WPSL Elite)
Sitch played for the Chicago Red Stars in the Women's Premier Soccer League Elite (WPSL-Elite) during the summer of 2012.

Hammarby IF
In 2012, Sitch spent a season with Hammarby IF and roomed with her Red Stars teammate, Lori Chalupny. She scored one goal and captained her team to promotion to the Damallsvenskan that season.

Chicago Red Stars (NWSL)
In 2013, Sitch returned to the Red Stars for the inaugural season of the National Women's Soccer League. She was waived by the Red Stars on July 31, 2014. She officially announced her retirement as an active player on April 9, 2015.

International career
Sitch was a member of the United States U-21 women's national soccer team that won the Nordic Cup in 2004.

Coaching career
Sitch served as an assistant coach for the University of Chicago women's soccer team from 2015 to 2017. She became an assistant coach for the UIC Flames in 2018.

In February 2020, Sitch returned to the Chicago Red Stars organization to serve as an assistant first team coach and also the manager for reserve team in the Women's Premier Soccer League.

Since April 20, 2022, Sitch has been the head coach of the University of Chicago men's soccer team.

References

External links
 Melbourne Victory player profile
 Chicago Red Stars player profile
 Women's Professional Soccer player profile
 DePaul player profile
 

1983 births
Living people
DePaul Blue Demons women's soccer players
American women's soccer players
Melbourne Victory FC (A-League Women) players
NJ/NY Gotham FC players
Western New York Flash players
Atlanta Beat (WPS) players
Expatriate women's soccer players in Australia
Hammarby Fotboll (women) players
Damallsvenskan players
Chicago Red Stars players
Women's Premier Soccer League Elite players
Bälinge IF players
Expatriate women's footballers in Sweden
American expatriate women's soccer players
USL W-League (1995–2015) players
American expatriate sportspeople in Sweden
American expatriate sportspeople in Australia
Women's association football defenders
National Women's Soccer League players
People from Oswego, Illinois
Soccer players from Illinois
F.C. Indiana players
Chicago Red Stars non-playing staff
Women's Professional Soccer players
Chicago Maroons men's soccer coaches
Chicago Cobras players